Strike zone may refer to:
 Strike zone, in baseball, the area over home plate through which a pitch must pass in order to count as a strike 
 Strike Zone, a science fiction novel set in the Star Trek expanded universe
 "Strike Zone", a song by Loverboy from their 1983 album Keep It Up
Strike Zones, a percussion concerto by Joan Tower